New Zealand competed at the 1948 Summer Olympics in London, England. Seven competitors, six men and one woman, took part in eight events in five sports. New Zealand was one of 22 nations that did not win any medals.

Competitors
The following table lists the number of New Zealand competitors who participated at the 1948 Summer Olympics according to gender and sport. The last surviving member of the 1948 Olympic team, swimmer Ngaire Lane, died on 9 July 2021.

Athletics

Boxing

Cycling

Swimming

Weightlifting

Officials
 Team manager – David Woodfield

References

External links
New Zealand Olympic Committee – Games Profile: 1948 London

Nations at the 1948 Summer Olympics
1948
Summer Olympics